Agafosha may refer to:
Agafosha, a diminutive of the Russian male first name Agafon
Agafosha, a diminutive of the Russian male first name Agafonik